Shimurali (often spelled 'Simurali') is a census town in Chakdaha CD block in the Kalyani subdivision of the Nadia district in the state of West Bengal, India.

History
Shimurali is a culturally diverse place. In the past, it was best known for its river port, which fell under the Calcutta Port Trust Corporation (C.P.T.), a British port trust.

Geography

Location

Area overview
Nadia district is part of the large alluvial plain formed by the Ganges-Bhagirathi system. The Kalyani subdivision has the Bhagirathi/ Hooghly on the west. Topographically, Kalyani subdivision is a part of the Ranaghat-Chakdaha Plain, the low-lying area found in the south-eastern part of the district. The smallest subdivision in the district, area-wise, has the highest level of urbanisation in the district. 76.73% of the population lives in urban areas and 23.27% lives in the  rural areas.

Note: The map alongside presents some of the notable locations in the subdivision. All places marked in the map are linked in the larger full screen map. All the four subdivisions are presented with maps on the same scale – the size of the maps vary as per the area of the subdivision.

Demographics
According to the 2011 Census of India, Simurali had a total population of 5,027, of which 2,509 (50%) were males and 2,518 (50%) were females. Population in the age range 0-6 years was 401. The total number of literate persons in Simurali was 4,233 (91.50% of the population over 6 years).

Infrastructure
According to the District Census Handbook 2011, Nadia, Simurali covered an area of 1.5255 km2. Among the civic amenities, the protected water supply involved overhead tank, tubewell/ borewell, hand pump. It had 508 domestic electric connections. Among the medical facilities it had 3 medicine shops. Among the educational facilities it had 2 primary schools, 3 middle schools, 3 secondary schools, 2 senior secondary schools.

Transport
Simurali railway station is 58 km  from Sealdah station of Kolkata. 

National Highway 12 (old no. NH 34) connects the town to Kolkata.

Education
Shimurali is known for the Shimurali Sachinandan College of Education, which is part of the University of Kalyani. There are many public primary schools in the area, as well as private English medium schools. Some Bengali medium schools include:
 Rautari High School for Boys (est. 1964)
 Rautari High School for Girls
 Shikarpur Vivekananda High School (est. 1967)
 Shikarpur Vivekananda High School for Girls
 Shimurali Upendra Bidyabhaban for Boys (est. 1946)
 Shimurali Upendra Bidyabhaban for Girls

Gallery

References

External links

Cities and towns in Nadia district